"My Way" is a song popularized in 1969 by Frank Sinatra set to the music of the French song "Comme d'habitude" composed by Jacques Revaux with lyrics by Gilles Thibaut and Claude François and first performed in 1967 by Claude François. Its English lyrics were written by Paul Anka and are unrelated to the original French song.  

The song was a success for a variety of performers including Sinatra, Elvis Presley, and Sid Vicious. Sinatra's version of "My Way" spent 75 weeks in the UK Top 40, which is 3rd place all-time.

Background
In 1967, Jacques Revaux wrote a ballad named "For Me", with English lyrics about a couple falling out of love. According to Revaux, the demo was then sent to Petula Clark, Dalida, and Claude François, to no avail. Revaux rejected a version by Hervé Villard, the singer of the international hit Capri c'est fini and reworked the track into Comme d'habitude ("As usual") with the help of Claude François. It was released in November 1967 and was at the top of the French pop chart for one week in February 1968.

Paul Anka heard the French original, while on holiday in the south of France. He flew to Paris to negotiate the rights to the song. He acquired adaptation, recording, and publishing rights for the nominal but formal consideration of one dollar, subject to the provision that the melody's composers would retain their original share of royalty rights with respect to whatever versions Anka or his designates created or produced.  Some time later, Anka had a dinner in Florida with Frank Sinatra and "a couple of Mob guys" during which Sinatra said: "I'm quitting the business. I'm sick of it; I'm getting the hell out."

Back in New York, Anka re-wrote the original French song for Sinatra, subtly altering the melodic structure and changing the lyrics: At one o'clock in the morning, I sat down at an old IBM electric typewriter and said, 'If Frank were writing this, what would he say?' And I started, metaphorically, 'And now the end is near.' I read a lot of periodicals, and I noticed everything was 'my this' and 'my that'. We were in the 'me generation' and Frank became the guy for me to use to say that. I used words I would never use: 'I ate it up and spit it out.' But that's the way he talked. I used to be around steam rooms with the Rat Pack guys—they liked to talk like Mob guys, even though they would have been scared of their own shadows. Anka finished the song at 5 in the morning: "I called Frank up in Nevada—he was at Caesars Palace – and said, 'I've got something really special for you. Anka asserted: "When my record company caught wind of it, they were very pissed that I didn't keep it for myself. I said, 'Hey, I can write it, but I'm not the guy to sing it.' It was for Frank, no one else."

Despite this, Anka would record the song in 1969 very shortly after Sinatra's recording was released. Anka recorded it four other times as well: in 1996 (as a duet with Gabriel Byrne, performed in the movie Mad Dog Time); in 1998 in Spanish as "A Mi Manera" (duet with Julio Iglesias); in 2007 (as a duet with Jon Bon Jovi); and in 2013 (as a duet with Garou).

On December 30, 1968, Frank Sinatra recorded his version of the song in one take, featuring session drummer Buddy Saltzman among the band.
“My Way” was released in early 1969 on the My Way LP and as a single. It reached No. 27 on the Billboard Hot 100 chart and No. 2 on the Easy Listening chart in the US. In the UK, the single achieved a still unmatched record, becoming the recording with the most weeks inside the Top 40, spending 75 weeks from April 1969 to September 1971. It spent a further 49 weeks in the Top 75 but never bettered the No. 5 slot achieved upon its first chart run.

Although this work became Frank Sinatra's signature song, his daughter Tina says the singer came to hate the song: "He didn't like it. That song stuck and he couldn't get it off his shoe. He always thought that song was self-serving and self-indulgent."

Charts

Certifications

Versions
David Bowie reportedly wrote the first English language lyrics to Claude François's original tune, though the lyrics and performance were only informally recorded and never commercially published.

Dorothy Squires
In the midst of Sinatra's multiple runs on the UK Singles Chart, Welsh singer Dorothy Squires also released a rendition of "My Way" in Summer 1970. Her recording reached number 25 on the UK Singles Chart and re-entered the chart twice more during that year.

Elvis Presley

Elvis Presley began performing the song in concert during the mid-1970s, despite Anka's suggestions that the song did not suit him. Nevertheless, on January 12 and 14, 1973, Presley sang the song during his satellite show Aloha from Hawaii Via Satellite, beamed live and on deferred basis (for European audiences, who also saw it in prime time), to 43 countries via Intelsat.

On October 3, 1977, several weeks after Presley's death, his live recording of "My Way" (recorded for the Elvis In Concert CBS-TV special on June 21, 1977) was released as a single. In the U.S., it reached number 22 on the Billboard Hot 100 pop singles chart in late 1977/early 1978 (higher than Frank Sinatra's peak position), number 6 on the Billboard Adult Contemporary chart, and went gold for its successful sales of over a million copies. The following year the single reached number 2 on the Billboard Country singles chart but went all the way to number 1 on the rival Cash Box Country Singles chart. In the UK, it reached number 9 on the UK Singles Chart.

Presley's version is featured in the climax of the 2001 film 3000 Miles to Graceland with Kurt Russell and Kevin Costner. (Paul Anka appears in a cameo as a casino pit boss who loathes Presley.)

Presley's studio version of the song, recorded in 1971, was included on the fourth disc of "Walk a Mile in My Shoes: The Essential '70s Masters".

Certifications

Sid Vicious

Sex Pistols' bassist Sid Vicious did a punk rock version of the song, in which a large body of the words were changed and the arrangement was sped up. The orchestral backing was arranged by Simon Jeffes.

Interviewed in 2007, Paul Anka said he had been "somewhat destabilized by the Sex Pistols' version. It was kind of curious, but I felt he [Sid Vicious] was sincere about it."

Vicious and his girlfriend, Nancy Spungen, changed many of the words when it was recorded, including use of the swear words "cunt" and "fuck" as well as the word "queer" (slang for a gay man). Vicious's reference to a "prat who wears hats" was an in-joke directed towards Vicious's friend and Sex Pistols bandmate Johnny Rotten, who was fond of wearing different kinds of hats he would pick up at rummage sales.

Leonard Cohen said of the song: 

The 1986 film Sid and Nancy features a scene where Gary Oldman, portraying Vicious, performs his version of "My Way" while filming the song's music video.

Vicious's version of this song appears in Martin Scorsese's 1990 film Goodfellas, where it plays over the end credits.

Margaret Mackie and Jamie Lee Morley
In December 2019 footage of Margaret Mackie, a resident of Northcare Suites Care Home in Edinburgh who suffers from dementia, performing "My Way" with staff member Jamie Lee Morley, went viral after being posted online by Mackie's daughter.   

Morley later arranged to have the song professionally recorded and it was released in January 2020 as a charity single to raise funds for The Alzheimer's Society and Dementia UK. The single peaked at number seven in the iTunes top 40 UK Pop Songs live chart and number five in the Amazon best seller chart.

Yuzo Kayama
In Japan, Yuzo Kayama, who is usually called the Japanese Frank Sinatra, performed "My Way" in 2008 in English. On April 23 and 30, 2015, as part of 2 vocal overdubbed sessions, Yuzo Kayama performed "My Way" with the earlier record of Frank Sinatra as a duet.

Adaptations
Besides translations more or less faithful to the original, some artists have set unrelated lyrics to the same tune.
Jozsef Gregor the renowned Hungarian bass-baritone/basso buffo recorded the song with Andras Ruszanov's Hungarian love themed lyrics version in 1996. Two years later, he sang this version in one of the most popular TV show in Budapest, since then this version has been permanently on the playlists of numerous radio stations in Hungary.
Mexican singer Vicente Fernandez did a Spanish language version, named "A Mi Manera".
A version of the song with slightly different lyrics was used as a jingle for a Cologuard commercial in 2022.

Public use
The song is popularly associated with nostalgia to an individual's lifetime of events. Surveys beginning in 2005 have often reported that "My Way" has been the song most frequently played at funeral services in the UK. "My Way" is also a popular karaoke song around the world. However, it has been reported to cause numerous incidents of violence and homicide among karaoke singers in the Philippines, referred to in the media as the My Way killings, which has led to the song being banned in many Filipino bars.

The song's association with Sinatra led to Mikhail Gorbachev's policy of allowing other states in the Warsaw Pact to make their own policy decisions being nicknamed the Sinatra Doctrine, referencing "My Way"'s lyrics about doing things your own way. The term was first used by Foreign Ministry spokesman Gennadi Gerasimov in 1987, who was quoted as saying "We now have the Frank Sinatra doctrine. He has a song, I Did It My Way. So every country decides on its own which road to take."

References

External links
 Song lyrics

1960s ballads
1969 singles
1970 singles
1977 singles
1980 singles
Pop ballads
Frank Sinatra songs
Elvis Presley songs
Paul Anka songs
Dorothy Squires songs
Grammy Hall of Fame Award recipients
Schlager songs
Songs about nostalgia
Songs about death
President Records singles
RCA Records singles
Songs with music by Claude François
Songs written by Jacques Revaux
Songs written by Gilles Thibaut
Songs written by Paul Anka
Reprise Records singles
Virgin Records singles
1969 songs